Ataxia uniformis is a species of beetle in the family Cerambycidae. It was described by Warren Samuel Fisher in 1926. It is known from Trinidad.

References

Ataxia (beetle)
Beetles described in 1926